So Good may refer to:

Albums
 So Good (Mica Paris album) or the title song, 1988
 So Good (The Whispers album) or the title song, 1984
 So Good (Zara Larsson album) or the title song (see below), 2017
 So Good (EP), by T-ara, 2015
 So Good: 12" Club Collection, by Brenda K. Starr, 2004

Songs
 "So Good" (B.o.B song), 2012
 "So Good" (Boyzone song), 1995
 "So Good" (Davina song), 1997
 "So Good" (Dove Cameron song), 2019
 "So Good" (Electrik Red song), 2009
 "So Good" (Eternal song), 1994
 "So Good" (Halsey song), 2022
 "So Good" (Louisa Johnson song), 2016
 "So Good" (Rachel Stevens song), 2005
 "So Good" (Wa Wa Nee song), 1989
 "So Good" (Zara Larsson song), 2017
 "So Good", by Austin Mahone from Oxygen, 2018
 "So Good", by Bat for Lashes from Lost Girls, 2019
 "So Good", by Big Sean and Metro Boomin from Double or Nothing, 2017
 "So Good", by Day26 from Forever in a Day, 2009
 "So Good", by Destiny's Child from The Writing's on the Wall, 1999
 "So Good", by Jennifer Lopez from A.K.A., 2014
 "So Good", by Juliet Roberts, 1997
 "So Good", by Red Velvet from RBB, 2018
 "So Good", from the Rock Angelz film soundtrack, 2005

Other uses
 So Good (soy beverage), a brand of soy milk
 So Good (TV series), a 2008–2010 Hong Kong cooking program
 So Good: 100 Recipes from My Kitchen to Yours, a 2017 cookbook by Richard Blais

See also
 
 Too Good (disambiguation)